Strike a pose or variant, may refer to:

Music
 'Strike a Pose', a lyric from the 1990 Madonna song "Vogue" (Madonna song)
 "What It Is (Strike a Pose)" (song; aka "Strike a Pose"), a 2008 song by Lil Mama off the album VYP
 "Strike a Pose" (Namie Amuro song), a 2017 song by Namie Amuro off the single Just You and I
 "Strike a Pose" (Young T & Bugsey song), a 2019 song by Young T & Bugsey off the album Plead the 5th

Television
 "Strike a Pose" (episode), a 2013 TV episode of Perfect Score
 "Strike a Pose" (episode), a 2017 TV episode of Spartan: Ultimate Team Challenge
 "Strike a Pose!" (episode), a 2021 TV episode of Germany's Next Topmodel (season 16)

Videogaming
 'Strike a Pose', a game mode from the videogame Just Dance (video game)
 'Strike a Pose', a game mode from the videogame Boogie (video game)
 "Strike a Pose", a mini-game from the videogame Dance Central 3

Other uses
 'strike a pose', a command in Vogueing from the Vogue (dance)
 Strike a Pose (film), a 2016 documentary film about Madonna's concert tour "Blonde Ambition"
 Catwalk: Strike a Pose (book), a novel in the Catwalk novel series by Deborah Gregory

See also

 Striking Poses (film), a 1999 U.S. film
 Strike (disambiguation)
 Pose (disambiguation)